Maloalexandrovka, Maloaleksandrovka (Russian-language names) Maloolexandrivka, Malooleksandrivka (Ukrainian-language names)  is the name of the following settlements:

Kazakhstan
, a village in Akkol District, Kazakhstan

Russia
, a village in Belebeyevsky District, Baskortostan, Russia

Ukraine